Hikmah (also Hikmat, literally wisdom, philosophy; rationale, underlying reason, from Semitic root  ) is a concept in Islamic philosophy and law.

Mulla Sadra defined hikmah as "coming to know the essence of beings as they really are" or as "a man's becoming an intellectual world corresponding to the objective world". Various Islamic commentaries describe hikmah as "to know the best of things by way of the best of sciences ...", having experience, using "justice in judging", "knowledge of the reality of things", "that which prevents ignorance," putting "things in their proper places, assigning them to their proper status", etc. According to Ibn al-Qayyim, the highest and most exclusive of the three levels of hikmah are "reserved for the Companions over the rest of the Ummah, and it is the highest level that the [Islamic] scholars can reach."

As a term of fiqh (Islamic jurisprudence), Taqi Usmani describes it as "the wisdom and the philosophy taken into account by the legislator while framing the [Islamic] law or the benefit intended to be drawn by [the law's] enforcement". One Dr Dipertua calls it "the objectives and wisdom" as "prescribed by Shariah".

Usmani gives as an example the secular law for traffic lights, where illat (another term of fiqh meaning "the basic feature of a transaction that causes relevant law to be applied") is obedience to stopping at red lights, and hikmah is traffic safety—avoiding vehicle and pedestrian collisions.

See also
 Chokhmah
 Hikmat al-Ishraq
 Hikmat al-Muta’aliyah
 Irfan
 Ma'rifa
 Muʿtazila

References 

Arabic words and phrases
Wisdom